Les Longs Manteaux is a Franco-Argentine film, directed by Gilles Béhat, which links drama and action in the spaghetti-western genre. Released in 1986, it lasts 1 hour 46 minutes.

Synopsis
Loïc Murat, a French geologist, makes camp on a Bolivian mountain. He comes across a group of fascists, Les Longs Manteaux, who want to assassinate the writer Juan Mendez. Murat also gets to know Julia, Mendez's daughter.

Production
The army uniforms came from the Argentine Army.

External links
 

1986 films
1980s French-language films
1980s Spanish-language films
Films set in Bolivia
Films set in Argentina
Films directed by Gilles Béhat
1986 multilingual films
Argentine multilingual films
French multilingual films
1980s French films
1980s Argentine films